Pentapodus setosus, commonly known as the butterfly whiptail, is a marine fish native to the western Pacific Ocean.

References

External links
 

Fish of Thailand
Fish of the Philippines
Fish of the Pacific Ocean
Fish described in 1830
Nemipteridae